The pale-bellied myna (Acridotheres cinereus) is a species of starling in the family Sturnidae. It is endemic to the southwestern peninsula of Sulawesi (south from Ranteapo), Indonesia. It has been introduced to Tawau, Sabah (Borneo).

References

pale-bellied myna
Endemic birds of Sulawesi
pale-bellied myna
pale-bellied myna
Taxonomy articles created by Polbot